Leers Weinzapfel Associates Architects, Inc. is the first women-owned firm in history to win the American Institute of Architects Architecture Firm Award in 2007. Founded by Andrea Leers and Jane Weinzapfel in 1982, the work of Leers Weinzapfel Associates is known for its design innovation and excellence in the public realm.

Projects
 The Paul S. Russell, MD Museum of Medical History and Innovation at Massachusetts General Hospital
 Expansion of the Harvard Science Center, Harvard University
 Harvard New College Theater/Farkas Hall (formerly Hasty Pudding)
 University of Pennsylvania Chiller Plant
 Zachs Hillel House, Trinity College, Hartford, Connecticut (2002) 
The John W. Olver Design Building at the University of Massachusetts Amherst in Amherst, Massachusetts (2017)
Adohi Hall at the University of Arkansas in Fayetteville, Arkansas (2019)

External links
 Leers Weinzapfel Associates

Bibliography

References

American companies established in 1982
Companies based in Boston
Architecture firms based in Massachusetts
1982 establishments in Massachusetts